The National Trumpet Competition is an annual music competition for students in the US that usually takes place in mid-March. It includes classical and jazz divisions at school through college levels for soloists and ensembles. The competition was formerly held at George Mason University until 2013; then moved to Messiah College in 2014 and 2015, Columbus State University in 2016, Metropolitan State University in 2017, and University of North Texas in 2018. The 2019 competition was held at the University of Kentucky.

Applications 
Students can register by completing an online form at the competition website, as well as attaching a link to a YouTube or Vimeo video of them performing only a published (including a self-published) composition from the trumpet repertoire, with piano accompaniment. They must also send in an application fee, and an NTC pianist fee (optional). Entrants are selected based on their videos, and are notified of results in mid-January.

Semi-finals and finals 
The competition was founded in 1991 by Dr. Dennis Edelbrock, who teaches trumpet at George Mason University in Fairfax, Virginia, and finals were held there through 2013.

Semi-finals and finals in each division are now held at the Schwob School of Music at Columbus State University. They are judged by professional trumpeters from around the area including Steven Hendrickson of the National Symphony Orchestra, Dr. Edelbrock, and members from Washington D.C.'s military bands. Depending on the division, there are about 25-50 competitors (except the junior division, which is usually smaller). After the first day, about five soloists and ensembles (although often ranging from 3 to 6) from each division move on to the finals, which usually take place a day or two later and at which one winner is chosen. Second and third place finalists usually also receive an award.  The finalists have their finals audition posted on YouTube.

Results

Ensemble Division

Past solo winners
 James F. Burke (Musician) was declared national champion in 1939. 
 James Peyden Shelton was awarded 1st place in the 2014 Graduate Soloist Division performing Joseph Turrin's Concerto for Trumpet and Orchestra.
 Natalie Dungey won the Junior division in 2009, when she was 10, with a performance of the Trumpet Concerto by Alexander Arutiunian that attracted international attention on YouTube.
 Chad Winkler won in 1995, 1998, and 2000.
 Caleb Hudson won in 2001 and 2004 and was part of the first-place Juilliard ensembles in 2009 and 2010.
 Olivier Anthony Theurillat was awarded 1st place in the highest soloist division in 1996.
 Charles Porter won in 1st place in classical college division in 1999 and 1st place in jazz college division in 2000.

References

External links
 Official website

Music competitions in the United States